The Power of Positive Swinging is an album released by American jazz trumpeter Clark Terry and trombonist Bob Brookmeyer featuring tracks recorded in 1965 and originally released on the Mainstream label.

Reception

Allmusic awarded the album 4 stars and states: "As expected, there was always plenty of interplay between the fluent horns and some sly examples of their humor".

Track listing
 "Dancing on the Grave" (Bob Brookmeyer) - 2:33
 "The Battle Hymn of the Republic" (Traditional) - 3:32
 "The King" (Count Basie) - 5:44
 "Ode to a Flugelhorn" (Clark Terry) - 5:38
 "A Gal in Calico" (Leo Robin, Arthur Schwartz) - 6:04
 "Green Stamps" (Brookmeyer) - 5:08
 "Hawg Jawz" (Terry) - 2:24
 "Simple Waltz" (Terry) - 5:18
 "Just an Old Manuscript" (Andy Razaf, Don Redman) - 7:30

Personnel 
Clark Terry - trumpet, flugelhorn
Bob Brookmeyer - valve trombone
Roger Kellaway - piano
Bill Crow - bass  
Dave Bailey - drums

References 

1965 albums
Clark Terry albums
Bob Brookmeyer albums
Mainstream Records albums
Albums produced by Bob Shad